Big Up may refer to:

 Big Up (group), a Black gay men's group that merged with GMFA
 "Big Up" (Shaggy song), a song by Shaggy
 "Big Up" (Avalon song), 2005 song by Swedish duo group Avalon
 Big Ups (band), American musical band
 Big UP Productions, American film production company
 The Big Up Festival, a festival of music, art and culture in Ghent, New York